Raycom Sports is an Charlotte, North Carolina-based producer of sports television programs owned by Gray Television.

It was founded in 1979 by husband and wife, Rick and Dee Ray. In the 1980s, Raycom Sports established a prominent joint venture with Jefferson-Pilot Communications which made them partners on the main Atlantic Coast Conference (ACC) college basketball package. Raycom was acquired in 1994 by Ellis Communications. Two years later, Ellis was acquired by a group led by Retirement Systems of Alabama, who renamed the entire company Raycom Media to build upon the awareness of Raycom Sports. The company would be acquired by Gray in 2019.

Raycom Sports was well known for its tenure with the ACC, and also had former relationships with the SEC, Big Eight, and Big Ten conferences, as well as the now-defunct Southwest Conference. In the 2010s, Raycom lost both its ACC and SEC rights to ESPN (a network which had, in its early years, picked up Raycom-distributed ACC basketball games for national broadcasts), and transferred these rights to in-house cable networks. Raycom Sports continues to produce a package of syndicated ACC telecasts aired by the Bally Sports channels and other regional sports networks. Via Raycom Sports or related operation Tupelo Raycom, Gray produces NFL preseason games for several teams, including the Atlanta Falcons, Carolina Panthers and New Orleans Saints.

History

Founding
Raycom Sports was started in July 1979 by Rick and Dee Ray in Charlotte. Rick Ray was a program manager at WCCB in Charlotte when he proposed that WCCB, which had become an independent station a year earlier after losing its ABC affiliation, produce more basketball games. Ray thought that they would be very profitable for WCCB, given North Carolina's reputation as a college basketball hotbed.

The company's first event was the Great Alaska Shootout. Ken Haines was one of the first hired for Raycom Sports. In its first year, it also acquired rights to basketball games from the Atlantic Coast Conference: some of them were syndicated to a newly launched cable sports channel, ESPN.
In 1988, Raycom added Big Ten Conference games to its portfolio after acquiring Rasmussen Communications. The company also extended its contract through 1995 to gain rights to all non-network conference games. The following year, Raycom established a radio division, acquiring the rights to the University of Illinois and Purdue University radio networks.

Partnership with Jefferson-Pilot Communications
In 1980, Raycom made what would prove to be its biggest splash when it teamed up with Jefferson-Pilot Communications to take over production of ACC basketball games. The package had begun in 1957 when Greensboro businessman C. D. Chesley piped North Carolina's run to the 1957 national title to a hastily created network of five stations across North Carolina. It proved popular enough that it expanded to a full-time package of basketball games the following season. The January 14, 1973 game between NC State @ Maryland was the first Super Bowl Sunday college basketball national telecast. Chelsey would again syndicate an ACC game (Maryland @ NC State) nationally on Super Bowl Sunday the following year. The ACC title game was often syndicated outside of the ACC region (such as New York) in these years.

The commentators that Chesley used included Jim Thacker, Ray Scott, Billy Packer, and Dick Enberg (on the UCLA at Maryland contest on December 28, 1974, and Notre Dame at Maryland contest on January 4, 1975, both which were co-productions with TVS). In 1978, Chesley (who controlled the ACC rights at the time) wanted NBC to televise some ACC conference games as part of its national package as it had the previous few years. However, NBC wanted to feature intersectional games. This offended Chesley, who proceeded to sell the rights to the ACC tournament final to ABC, which explains the absence of ACC home games on NBC's 1977–78 schedule.

Chesley retained the rights to ACC games until 1981, when the conference bought him out and sold the rights to Metrosports of Rockville, Maryland. Some ACC games were telecast by Raycom alone in 1980 through four or five television stations in North Carolina, including WCCB.

For the 1981–82 season, the two companies formed a joint venture, Raycom/JP Sports, that won the package after the ACC turned down Metrosports' bid to renew its contract. Raycom also assisted ESPN2 by selling a 1995 Duke-Carolina basketball game that increased the channel's credibility with cable operators. In the 1983 season, Raycom experimented with a cable-oriented ACC service known as ACC Ticket. Raycom had built a large array of broadcasting rights until the 1990s, with rights for ACC, SEC, Pac-10, Metro, Big Eight, Big 12, and Southwest conferences. Raycom sub-licensed ACC games to national broadcasters (including CBS, and ESPN), regional sports networks, and local stations. However, with the rise of cable and regional sports networks, Raycom began to lose many of its college rights to competitors.

In 1987, Raycom Sports has plans to set up an entertainment division, Raycom Entertainment, with an hour special Elvis' Graceland, which was fronted by Priscilla Presley, which was previously presented on Showtime, and the new Raycom Entertainment division would be headed by Peter G. Lenz, who previously ran The Television Program Source, and picked up by 125 stations, and all 27 of the 30 markets has been all cleared, and it will have an hour weekly series in development.

Unlike other sports syndicators, Raycom controlled nearly all advertising for the broadcast, but paid stations for the airtime. While this was a risky strategy at first, Raycom reaped a huge windfall since ACC games frequently garnered ratings in the 20s and 30s. The ACC's regional territory happened to include several fast-growing markets such as Charlotte, the Piedmont Triad, the Triangle, Hampton Roads, Richmond, Baltimore, and Washington, D.C.

Raycom Media
In 1994, Raycom Sports was sold to Ellis Communications, but remained autonomous, with its own headquarters in Charlotte. Dee Ray left in 1994 while Rick Ray left in 1995. When an investment group led by Retirement Systems of Alabama bought Ellis in 1996, the Raycom name was so well respected that it chose to rename the entire broadcast group Raycom Media.

In 1994, Raycom first organized a pre-season event known as the Great Eight, televised by ESPN, which aimed to feature two nights of doubleheaders between regional finalists from the previous season's NCAA tournament (with the highest-ranked team eliminated before the regional finals serving as a backup if a team declined an invitation). The inaugural edition featured Boston College, Duke, Florida, Michigan, Missouri, Purdue, Villanova, and UConn (which replaced Arkansas as a backup). Several teams (including defending champion UCLA, Connecticut and North Carolina) declined invites, while Michigan State received an invite. In 1996, the event moved to United Center under a five-year contract.

By August 1997, Raycom lost the Pac-10 and Big 12 college football advertising sales rights to Fox Sports Networks. Several executives also left the company, including Steedman.

In 2002, Raycom founded the Continental Tire Bowl in Charlotte. It continues to operate the game, which later changed its name to the Meineke Car Care Bowl until 2011, when it became the Belk Bowl.

Starting in 2004, the Raycom/JP partnership took over production of syndicated ACC football games; Jefferson-Pilot had produced ACC football alone since September 1984. In 2007, Raycom began broadcasting the ACC men's basketball tournament in HDTV and broadcast 4 ACC men's basketball regular season games in HD in 2008. In 2006, in accordance with Lincoln National Corporation's acquisition of Jefferson-Pilot, Jefferson-Pilot Communications was renamed Lincoln Financial Media, and the venture was renamed Raycom/LF Sports.

On November 12, 2007, Raycom Media announced its intention to acquire some of the television broadcasting properties of Lincoln Financial Media—including three television stations, plus Lincoln Financial Sports—for $583 million. Lincoln Financial Sports was merged into Raycom Sports later that year, giving it full control over basketball and football rights for both the ACC and SEC.

In 2008, Raycom lost its SEC rights to ESPN, who reached a 15-year deal to become its main media rightsholder alongside CBS. ESPN continued to provide a syndicated package of games in a similar manner to Raycom, produced via its own syndication division under the on-air branding SEC Network until the launch of an SEC cable network under the same name in 2014.

In 2010, ESPN also acquired rights to ACC football and basketball, replacing Raycom. In a discussion between ACC commissioner John Swofford and then-ESPN president John Skipper, Swofford acknowledged Raycom's long-standing relationship with the conference, and requested that it continue to be involved in some way. ESPN ultimately negotiated a sub-licensing agreement with Raycom, which would allow it to continue producing a syndicated package of ACC football and basketball broadcasts (which, as a condition of the deal, were rebranded under the new on-air title ACC Network in 2010). Additionally, Raycom became responsible for the ACC's digital media operations and sponsorship sales. 

In addition to the syndication component of the 2010 agreement, Raycom brokered a deal for another package of ACC football and basketball content which was dubbed the ACC Regional Sports Networks (RSN). ACC RSN broadcasts, produced by Raycom Sports production staff, were distributed nationally across a litany of cable sports networks including Fox Sports South, NESN, AT&T Sportsnet Pittsburgh, NESN, NBC Washington and YES, among others. Wes Durham served as the lead play-by-play voice of both football and basketball RSN packages from 2013 to 2019.

In 2012, Raycom Media acquired Tupelo-Honey, a producer of sports and entertainment programming. Three years later, it also acquired WebStream Sports, an Indianapolis-based producer of sports programming. In late-2016, the companies were merged to form the subsidiary Tupelo Raycom.

Haines retired as president at the end of 2015. Hunter Nickell, a former Speed Channel executive, replaced Haines as CEO in May 2016.

In January 2018, Raycom Sports announced a partnership with Blizzard Entertainment to produce a weekly television program chronicling Heroes of the Dorm—the official collegiate tournament of its video game Heroes of the Storm.

End of ACC syndication 
On July 21, 2016, ESPN announced a 20-year extension of its contract with the ACC, and the launch of an ACC Network cable channel in 2019. ESPN also acquired the secondary ACC rights previously held by Raycom. However, Raycom Sports will continue to serve as the ACC's RSN and digital partner, and be subcontracted by ESPN to produce event coverage for the new ACC Network. During the 2018–19 academic year, the ACC Network branding was changed back to Raycom Sports to avoid confusion with the ESPN-run ACC Network. Raycom's final syndicated ACC telecast was the 2019 ACC men's basketball tournament final.

Purchase by Gray Television 
On June 25, 2018, Albany, Georgia-based media group Gray Television announced it would be purchasing Raycom Media (Raycom Sports' parent) for $3.65 billion. The FCC approved the sale on December 20, 2018, and it was completed on January 2, 2019, making Raycom Sports a wholly-owned subsidiary of Gray.

Personalities

College basketball
 Mike Gminski analyst (2003–2019)
 Dan Bonner analyst (1983–2019)
 Tim Brando play-by-play (1990–2019)
 Steve Martin play-by-play (1991–2019)

College football
 Dave Archer analyst (2010–2019)
 Tommy Bowden analyst (2011–2019)
 Tim Brant play-by-play (2008–2016)
 Steve Martin play-by-play (1991–2019)

College baseball
 Tommy Hutton analyst (2012–2019)

Awards

Midsouth Regional Emmy Awards 
Raycom Sports' production department won 34 Midsouth Regional Emmy Awards between 2009 and 2020. The company earned a total of 73 nominations in that span. Winning streaks include: 6 straight wins in "Sports Segment" (2014–'19), 7 wins in "Sports/Live Event" in 8-year span and 5 wins in "Sports Program" in 6-year span.

Midsouth Emmy Award Wins

2009 (23rd Annual Awards) 
Sports Program/Series – "Football Saturdays in the South" (Rob Reichley, Alex Farmartino, Dave Barringer, Jeremy Williams, Lance Stewart, & Beverly Rumley)

Sports Segment – "Skipper" (Alex Farmartino)

Editor/Short Form – "ACC football open featuring Chris Daughtry" (Dave Barringer)

Photography/Short Form – "ACC football open featuring Chris Daughtry" (Dave Barringer & Jeremy Williams)

2010 (24th Annual Awards) 
Sports Program/Series – "Football Saturdays in the South" (Rob Reichley, Alex Farmartino, Dave Barringer, Jeremy Williams, Lance Stewart & Beverly Rumley)

Sports Segment – "Cameron Crazies" (Jeremy Williams)

Editor/Short Form – "SEC football open featuring Rascal Flatts" (Dave Barringer. Jeremy Williams, Chris Stevens)

Director/Short Form – "SEC football open featuring Rascal Flatts" (Dave Barringer)

2011 (25th Annual Awards) 
Magazine Special – "ACC Road Trip" (Tommy Kane, Alex Farmartino, Jeremy Williams, Dave Barringer)

2012 (26th Annual Awards) 
Sports Program/Series – "Football Saturdays in the South" (Rob Reichley, Alex Farmartino, Dave Barringer, Jeremy Williams)

Sports Segment – "Big Dawg" (Alex Farmartino)

Magazine Special – "ACC Road Trip" (Tommy Kane, Alex Farmartino, Jeremy Williams)

2013 (27th Annual Awards) 
Sports Program/Series – "Football Saturdays in the South" (Rob Reichley, Alex Farmartino, Dave Barringer, Jeremy Williams & Chris Duzan)

Sports Live Event Game  – "ACC Basketball: Duke vs North Carolina" (Rob Reichley, Billy McCoy)

2014 (28th Annual Awards) 
Sports Program/Series – "Football Saturdays in the South" (Rob Reichley, Alex Farmartino, Dave Barringer, Jeremy Williams, Chris Duzan, Maxwell Brooke & Richard Brooke)

Sports Live Event Game  – "ACC Football: NC State vs North Carolina" (Rob Reichley, Roy Alfers)

Sports Segment – "Rodney Rogers: The Durham Bull" (Jeremy Williams, Rob Reichley, Maxwell Brooke)

2015 (29th Annual Awards) 
Sports Live Event Game  – "ACC Basketball: NC State vs North Carolina" (Dave Barringer, Billy McCoy)

Documentary/Topical – "Head Impact Research in the ACC" (Alex Farmartino)

Sports Segment – "Toomer's Corner: The Final Roll" (Richard Brooke)

Sports Promo Spot – "Duke/North Carolina: Making of a Masterpiece" (Jeremy Williams, Boris Rogers, Josh Hairston, Richard Brooke)

2016 (30th Annual Awards) 
Documentary/Historical – "Charles Scott" (Jeremy Williams, Rob Reichley, David Daly, Maxwell Brooke, Richard Brooke)

Sports Segment – "Brian Stann" (Dave Barringer)

Sports Promo Spot – "Numbers of a Rivalry: Duke/North Carolina 2015 Tease" (Richard Brooke & Maxwell Brooke)

2017 (31st Annual Awards) 
Sports Live Event Game  – "2016 ACC Tournament Championship" (Rob Reichley, Alex Farmartino, Dave Barringer, Billy McCoy, Jeremy Williams, Chris Duzan, Jonathan Robbins, Josh Vinson)

Documentary/Historical – "The Red Bandanna" (Alex Farmartino, Chris Duzan, Maxwell Brooke)

Sports Segment – "Ever Faithful: The Resurrection of UAB Football" (Richard Brooke, Maxwell Brooke, Timothy Alexander, Jordan Smith, Kortney Cowart, Michael Shikany)

2018 (32nd Annual Awards) 
Sports Live Event Game  – "2017 ACC Tournament Championship" (Rob Reichley, Lonnie Dale, Alex Farmartino, Dave Barringer, Jeremy Williams, Jonathan Robbins, Josh Vinson)

Sports Segment – "James Conner – Conner Strong" (Alex Farmartino)

2019 (33rd Annual Awards) 
Sports Live Event Game  – "2018 ACC Tournament Championship" (Rob Reichley, Alex Farmartino, Dave Barringer, Jonathan Robbins. Josh Vinson, Jordan Smith)

Documentary/Topical – "Ramah" (Alex Farmartino, Maxwell Brooke, Josh Vinson, Jonathan Robbins)

Sports Segment – "Rory Coleman" (Josh Vinson)

2020 (34th Annual Awards) 
Sports Live Event Game  – "2019 ACC Tournament" (Rob Reichley, Alex Farmartino, Lonnie Dale, Billy McCoy, Maxwell Brooke, Jordan Smith, Stone Hill)

Sports Promo Spot – "Battle of the Blues" (Jordan Smith, Richard Brooke & Maxwell Brooke)

Other programming
Raycom was to have produced Team Racing Auto Circuit auto racing for ESPN in 2003; however, the league folded before ever actually staging any events.

In addition to college sports, Raycom has also produced preseason games for various National Football League teams. Through either Raycom Sports or Tupelo Raycom, it has produced games for the Carolina Panthers, New York Giants (since 2010), New Orleans Saints (since 2015: team flagship WVUE was owned by a group led by Saints owner Tom Benson and operated by Raycom, and was subsequently acquired by Raycom outright), and the Atlanta Falcons (since 2017).

Current taped programming
Havoline Football Saturdays in the South
Kings of the Court

Availability
Raycom Sports games were often part of the out-of-market sports packages ESPN GamePlan and ESPN Full Court, which are available on ESPN3.

References

External links

Raycom Sports on Twitter

 

Television production companies of the United States
College sports television syndicators
Gray Television